Notelaea ipsviciensis, also known as the Cooneana Olive, is a species of flowering plant in the olive family that is endemic to Australia.

Etymology
The specific epithet ipsviciensis refers to the type locality, of which it is a latinisation.

Description
The species grows as a slow-growing, multi-stemmed, lignotuberous, evergreen shrub up to 1–2 m in height. The small flowers are cream-yellow in colour. Each fleshy, purple fruit is about 10 mm wide, enclosing a single seed.

Distribution and habitat
The species is known only from three small populations in the Ipswich area of south-eastern Queensland. It is an understorey plant of open woodland, especially dry, eucalypt-dominated, sclerophyll communities on poor, sandstone-based soils.

Conservation
The species has been listed under Australia's EPBC Act as Critically Endangered. The main threat comes from gross land disturbance from open-cut coal mining and clay extraction, particularly from the dumping of overburden.

References

 
ipsviciensis
Flora of Queensland
Lamiales of Australia
Plants described in 2004